1879 was the 93rd season of cricket in England since the foundation of Marylebone Cricket Club (MCC). Lancashire claimed a share of the Champion County title for the first time.

The summer was the coolest and wettest over the two-and-a-half centuries of climatic records in England, and during the early part of the twentieth century exceptionally wet seasons such as 1903, 1912, 1924 and 1927 were very frequently compared to 1879.

Champion County 

 Lancashire, Nottinghamshire (shared)

Playing record (by county)

Leading batsmen (qualification 20 innings)

Leading bowlers (qualification 1,000 balls)

Notable events 
 25 March: Formation of Leicestershire County Cricket Club.
 For the last time to date, no batsman reached 1,000 runs for the season.

Notes 
An unofficial seasonal title sometimes proclaimed by consensus of media and historians prior to December 1889 when the official County Championship was constituted. Although there are ante-dated claims prior to 1873, when residence qualifications were introduced, it is only since that ruling that any quasi-official status can be ascribed.
Hampshire, though regarded until 1885 as first-class, played no inter-county matches

References

Annual reviews 
 John Lillywhite’s Cricketer’s Companion (Green Lilly), Lillywhite, 1880
 James Lillywhite’s Cricketers’ Annual (Red Lilly), Lillywhite, 1880
 John Wisden's Cricketers' Almanack 1880

External links 
 CricketArchive – season summaries

1879 in English cricket
English cricket seasons in the 19th century